Muse – Simulation Theory is a concert film by British rock band Muse, based on their 2018 album Simulation Theory and its supporting tour in 2019. Directed by Lance Drake, it was released on 17 August 2020 in a one-night only worldwide IMAX release, with a download and streaming release on 21 August.

The film combines live concert footage from Muse's shows at the O2 Arena in London from 14 to 15 September 2019, which were part of their worldwide Simulation Theory World Tour that took place throughout 2019, with more traditionally filmed scenes that take place in between and during songs, making up the film's narrative.

Synopsis

Concert footage
The film primarily consists of live concert footage of Muse's shows at the London O2 Arena in September 2019, with an overarching narrative tying the songs together. The songs featured in the film primarily focus on songs from the Simulation Theory album, but  multiple other songs from previous Muse albums are also included, as well as additional film pieces composed by Matt Bellamy. Some songs were shortened and re-ordered from how they were played live for the film, and multiple songs performed were omitted. The omitted songs included; "Plug in Baby", "Hysteria", "The 2nd Law: Unsustainable", "Time is Running Out", "Reapers" and "Knights of Cydonia".

Track listing
 "Algorithm" (Alternate Reality version)
 "Pressure"
 "Drill Sergeant" / "Psycho"
 "Break It to Me"
 "Pray (High Valyrian)" 
 "The Dark Side"
 "Supermassive Black Hole"
 "Thought Contagion"
 "Uprising" 
 "Propaganda"
 "Madness"
 "The Void"
 "Dig Down" (Acoustic Gospel Version)
 "Mercy"
 "Take a Bow"
 "Prelude" / "Starlight"
 "Algorithm"
 "Metal Medley" (Extracts from "Stockholm Syndrome", "The Handler", "Assassin" and "New Born")

Plot
A group of scientists are sent to investigate a mysterious source producing unknown paranormal activity, which leads them to a concert stage located in London with an arcade cabinet on it. One of the scientists called Murphy, touches the cabinet, causing him to break the fabric of his reality and is transported into another one where he finds himself in the crowd of a live Muse concert. After being pulled back to his reality, he is then bitten by a mysterious phantom, causing him to become infected with an unknown pathogen and mutate into a monster. A mysterious woman then appears and reveals that she is an NPC from the "mainframe". The NPC explains that due to a tear in their reality, a deadly virus has been released and a new entity, known as the "Truth Slayer", is being created.

The media reports on the virus and large sections of London are quarantined off to curb the infection rate, with multiple NPCs coming to fight off the infected people. The NPC then take control of the news broadcasts and puts words in their mouths, stating that the virus is a hoax and that "there is nothing to fear". The Truth Slayer then breaks out of his containment and a hero, known as "The One" (Matthew Bellamy), enters the same reality to stop him from gaining control of more. The One gains access to the mainframe, gaining the power of a glove, and confronts the Truth Slayer. After a climactic battle, The One prevails and defeats the Truth Slayer. The NPC closes the film by stating that while The One may have saved this reality, there are more.

Production and release
Muse's performances at the O2 Arena, London, on 14–15 September 2019 were filmed. Both the concert footage and the additional narrative scenes were directed by Lance Drake, who had previously worked with the band, directing the music videos for all 5 of the singles from Simulation Theory. Bellamy described the film as Muse's version of Pink Floyd – The Wall (1982), combining musical and dramatic scenes. It was planned for a general cinematic release, but this was abandoned due to the COVID-19 pandemic.

The film was announced on 11 August 2020 and was scheduled for release on 17 August 2020 in a one-night only IMAX cinema release, with a download and streaming release a few days later on 21 August. Two deluxe edition box-sets of the film were also announced for release on 11 December 2020; both sets contain a Blu-ray of the film with a 5.1 DTS-HD Master Audio mix packed in a VHS-inspired box, a vinyl LP and Compact Cassette containing selected tracks from the film as well as a comic of the film's story among other items.

Cast & Crew

Cast

Musicians 

 Matt Bellamy - lead vocals, guitars, piano, synthesizers on "Algorithm"
 Chris Wolstenholme - bass, backing vocals, guitar on "Dig Down (Acoustic Gospel Version)", percussion on "Pray (High Valyrian)"
 Dominic Howard - electric & acoustic drums, percussion, backing vocals on "Supermassive Black Hole", synthesizers on "Take a Bow"
 Morgan Nicholls - keyboards, synthesizers, backing vocals, percussion including cabasa on "Supermassive Black Hole" , guitar on "Uprising", "Mercy" & "Starlight"

Crew 
Per IMDB

Production 

 Lance Drake - director, producer
 Matt Bellamy - producer, composer
 Muse - producer
 Jessie Lee Stout - producer
 Jonathan Sidwell - first assistant director

Sound Department 

 Nicholas Feil - foley artist
 Ellan Heuner - foley artist
 Stephanie Kerbis - voice casting
 Sam Lewis - ADR mixer, supervising foley editor
 James Parnell - re-recording mixer
 Gerry Vazquez - supervising sound editor, sound design
 Aleks von Korff - re-recording mixer

Effects Department 

 Robert Mallin - special effects technician
 Philip Ballard - digital compositor
 Enrique de la Garza - visual effects artist
 Artur Elson - digital compositor
 Ben Jannasch - CG generalist
 Seth Josphson - Bidding producer
 Aaron Maxery - data I/O
 Mercedes Paulino - digital compositor
 Maryam Riah - digital compositor
 Michael Shusterman - visual effects editor
 Angella Szynkowski - data I/O
 Emma Wang - visual effects editor

Camera and Electrical Department 

 Gary Kent - steadicam operator
 Ben Lowe - camera operator
 Jon Priest - touring video technician

Costume and Wardrobe Department 

 Cristina Acevedo - costume designer
 Ari Tavelman - assistant costume designer

Editorial Department 

 Jullian Conner - post producer 
 Jeremiah Mayhew - film editor
 Michael Ochoa - color assistant 
 Erik Rogers - finishing producer
 Bryan Smaller - colorist

Additional Crew 

 Loreen Domijan - tour show caller
 Jeff Hodges - technical director
 Hannah Whiteoak - voiceover artist NPC

References 

2020 films
Concert films
Muse (band)
2020s English-language films